Bassoli is an Italian surname. Notable people with the surname include:

Alessandro Bassoli (born 1990), Italian footballer
Giacomo Bassoli (born 1990), Italian footballer, twin brother of Alessandro
Fiorenza Bassoli (1948–2020), Italian politician

Italian-language surnames